Cyrano de Bergerac is a 2008 made-for-television adaptation of the 1897 play by Edmond Rostand, starring Kevin Kline as Cyrano, Jennifer Garner as his cousin Roxanne, and Daniel Sunjata as Christian.  The production captures the 2007 Broadway revival, recorded before a live audience. The film was first broadcast on PBS' Great Performances on 7 January 2009.

Plot summary

Cast
 Kevin Kline as Cyrano de Bergerac
 Jennifer Garner as Roxanne
 Chris Sarandon as De Guiche
 Daniel Sunjata as Christian

Filming locations
The play was videotaped at the Richard Rodgers Theatre, in New York City.

References

External links
 
 

2008 television films
2008 films
American television films
Films based on Cyrano de Bergerac (play)
Filmed stage productions